This is a list of electricity-generating power stations in the U.S. state of South Carolina, sorted by type and name. In 2020, South Carolina had a total summer capacity of 24,122 MW through all of its power plants, and a net generation of 98,529 GWh. The corresponding electrical energy generation mix in 2021 was 53.8% nuclear, 23.3% natural gas, 15.2% coal, 4% hydroelectric, 2.3% biomass, 2.3% solar, and 0.1% petroleum.

South Carolina is the nation's third largest producer of nuclear power, with four nuclear plants. Natural gas has been the most rapidly growing source of generation; quadrupling over the decade starting 2010. Data from the U.S. Energy Information Administration serves as a general reference.

Nuclear power stations

Fossil-fuel power stations

Coal

 Units 2 and 3 were originally planned to be converted to natural gas as an interim step to closure, but those plans were abandoned.
 Fueled by mix of coal and natural gas
 Units 3 and 4 are permitted to fire up to 30% petcoke by weight on either boiler.

Natural Gas

Renewable power stations

Biomass

Hydroelectric

Solar

Storage power stations

Pumped storage

See also

List of power stations in the United States
List of pumped-storage hydroelectric power stations

References

 
South Carolina
Lists of buildings and structures in South Carolina
Energy in South Carolina